Ponmuttayidunna Tharavu is a 1988 Indian Malayalam-language romantic comedy-drama film, written by Raghunath Paleri and directed by Sathyan Anthikad. It stars Sreenivasan, Urvashi, Jayaram and Innocent in the lead roles. It was Sreenivasan's first role as a hero after Sanghaganam (1979). The film was remade in Hindi in 2010 as Dus Tola.

Plot
Bhaskaran (Sreenivasan), the local village goldsmith is in love with Snehalatha (Urvashi), the daughter of P. V. Panicker (Innocent), the local astrologer, his neighbour. Panicker wants his daughter to marry a rich man working in the Persian Gulf region. Snehalatha asks for a gold necklace made of ten sovereigns as a symbol of Bhaskaran's love and also to impress her father. Bhaskaran makes a necklace and hands it over to Snehalatha. An angry Panicker finds this out, admonishes her and pockets the golden necklace. He reasons that it was "brotherly love" which made Bhaskaran give the necklace to his daughter.

Panicker receives a marriage proposal from Pavithran (Jayaram), who is an orphan and working in Qatar, and accepts it. A few days before the marriage, Panicker walks up to the tea-shop where the regular patrons are in attendance. There, he shows a golden necklace saying that he purchased it from a nearby town and that it was a gift from him to his daughter. The village crowd appreciates Panicker's fatherly love. Bhaskaran finds out that this necklace was none other than the one he had given to Snehalatha a few days back.

Bhaskaran becomes impatient and finally he decides to march to Panicker's home and ask Snehalatha to marry him. In this daring mission he is accompanied by his friends and well wishers, namely the Velichappadu, an oracle (Jagathi Sreekumar), Pappi the cattle trader (Oduvil Unnikrishnan), Aboobacker (Mamukkoya) the tea-shop owner and Hajiyar (Karamana Janardanan Nair). Madhavan Nair (Sankaradi), an elderly respectable citizen of the village also joins in. A heated argument ensues at Panicker's household,  Snehalatha finally denying any love affair with Bhaskaran and Panicker refusing to return the golden necklace. Panicker argues that such a golden necklace was never given by Bhaskaran.

Bhaskaran soon becomes the joke of the village, with people saying that he was a fool to give the necklace (if such a thing existed), without any guarantee or surety. Life goes on in the village. Parvathy teacher (Shari) teaches dance on the second floor of Aboobacker's dilapidated tea shop. Pappi continues to buy and sell livestock, and Madhavan Nair makes his routine night visits to the village prostitute, Devayani. The Oracle is busy organising the local temple festival. Supported by his friends Bhaskaran starts a small jewellery shop (Bhaskaran & Sons) in the village.

Pavithran marries Snehalatha and returns to the Middle East. Snehalatha is pregnant and she comes back to her house for delivery. Soon the baby girl is born, and Pavithran also comes back. To the shock of the Panicker family, Pavithran says he is not planning to go back and plans to buy a few trucks and settle down in Kerala. His job abroad was not good and he even spent some time in jail there.

He invites Baskaran to Pierce his child's ear, but is insulted by his wife stating that he is not good at his work and it may harm baby, Baskaran, when he learns about this becomes very sad .
Pavithran is in need of more funds to finance his truck. He notices the gold necklace his wife regularly adorned herself with, which was worth ten sovereigns. Although Snehalatha refuses to give it, Pavithran takes it from her to pawn it for some quick money.

Pavithran consults Bhaskaran as he is the village goldsmith. Bhaskaran checks the necklace and confirms whether the necklace was given to him by Panicker. And when his regular friends have gathered in the village square, Bhaskaran declares that the necklace is made of copper, containing very little gold. Pavithran now humiliated, with his wife and kid storms into Panicker's home. He feels that he has been shortchanged, and Snehalatha was not true to him. Panicker is forced to admit that this necklace was not some thing which he purchased, but was given by Bhaskaran to Snehalatha some years back. The love affair of Snehalatha and Bhaskaran also now comes out in the open. This irritates Pavithran even further as he now feels everyone was tricking him. The villagers too take up sides, and a huge fight starts.

Like in a typical village, the fight soon stops and every thing returns to normal. When asked by Bhaskaran's father as to who gave him the idea to mix copper with gold. Bhaskaran replies that he learnt the idea from his father, who used to fool his wife (Bhaskaran's mother) by polishing copper with gold.  Pavithran finally decides to take back his wife and daughter. The movie ends with a note which indicates that Bhaskaran too has found his true love in the dance teacher, Parvathi.

Cast

Sreenivasan as thattan Bhaskharan
Shari as Parvathi 
Jayaram as Pavithran 
Urvashi as Snehalatha
Innocent as P. V. Panicker
K. P. A. C. Lalitha as Bhagiradhi 
Jagathi Sreekumar as the Velichappadu
Oduvil Unnikrishnan as Pappi
Sankaradi as Madhavan Nair 
Karamana Janardanan Nair as Hajiyar
Parvathy as Khalmayi, Hajiyar's wife
Mamukkoya as Abubakr
Krishnan Kutty Nair as Gopalan
Philomina as Bhaskaran's mother
Shyama as Savithry 
Aloor Elsy as Devayani

Soundtrack
The music was composed by Johnson with lyrics by O. N. V. Kurup.

Awards
Filmfare Awards South
 Filmfare Award for Best Actress - Urvashi

Trivia
 This movie was initially titled Ponmutta Idunna Thattaan(പൊന്മുട്ടയിടുന്ന തട്ടാൻ) (the goldsmith who lays the golden eggs). This was later changed after severe protests from the goldsmith community in Kerala.
 This movie was shot in a village called Thanneercode near Thrithala (തൃത്താല) in Palakkad District of Kerala.
 This film was remade in Hindi as Dus Tola. starring Manoj Bajpai in Sreenivasan's role. This film is distributed by Warner Bros.

References

External links
 

1980s Malayalam-language films
1988 films
Films directed by Sathyan Anthikad
Films with screenplays by Sreenivasan
Films shot in Palakkad
Films shot in Thrissur
Malayalam films remade in other languages
Films scored by Johnson